Kruszwica  is a town in central Poland and is situated in the Kuyavian-Pomeranian Voivodeship (since 1999), previously in Bydgoszcz Voivodeship (1975–1998). It has a population of 9,412 (2004). Initially founded in the 6th century, Kruszwica is the oldest town in the region and features a medieval castle with a 12th-century Romanesque church.

History

This article incorporates text from "The Political History of Poland" (1917) by Edward Henry Lewinski-Corwin, a publication now in the public domain.

Owing to the frequent raids of the Norsemen, the people of this region early organized an effective military force of defense. Under the protection of the military bands and their chiefs, the fields could safely be cultivated and the little, fortified towns (grody), which became places for the transaction of intertribal business and barter, for common worship, and for the storage of goods during a foreign invasion could be successfully defended and the wrongs of the people redressed. The military bands and their leaders soon became the unifying force, and the fortified towns, the centers of a larger political organization, with the freeman (Kmiec or Kmeton) as its base.

The first historical town of this nature was that of Kruszwica, on the Lake of Gopło. It soon gave place to that of Gniezno or Knezno, further west, which by its very name indicates that it was the residence of a Knez, or prince or duke. In time Poznań became the princely town, and the principality began to assert itself and to grow westward to the Oder, southward to the Barycza and eastward to the Pilica Rivers. In the east this territorial expansion met with the armed opposition of another large tribe, the Lenczanians, which was similarly organized under a military ruler and which occupied the plains between the Warta, Bzura and Pilica Rivers. Further east, in the forests of the middle course of the Vistula to the north of Pilica, lived the most savage of the Polish tribes, the Masovians. This tribe was the latest to come under the sovereignty of the principality and began its political existence on the bank of the Gopło Lake under the leadership of the Piast, whose dynasty ruled the country until 1370. To the north of the Netze River between the Oder and the Baltic, lived the northernmost of the tribes , at times conquered by Poland, known as Pomorzanie (in the Polish: people living by the sea); hence the name of the province Pomorze.

Some historical writers attribute the change in the political organization of the primitive Polanie tribe to the influence of foreign commerce, which for geographic reasons had early centered on the Gopło. At that period the lake was a very large body of water with a level at least ten feet higher than at present. The many small lakes now existing in the region were in all probability a part of Gopło, and the valleys of the vicinity constituted the bottom of the lake. There are many reasons to believe that such was the hydrography of the section in that remote age. In his  description of Gopło, written five hundred years ago, Jan Długosz, a Polish historian, speaks of a vast body of water, leading us to believe that the lake then was much larger than it is at the present time. There is reason to believe that five hundred years previous to this historian's time, before the primeval forests were cut, the lake was still larger. The supposition that Gopło at the time of its highest level was connected by means of small navigable streams with the rivers Warta, Oder and the Vistula is quite plausible.

The constructive fancy of the economic historian sees flotillas of Pomeranian merchants moving to and from Szczecin (Stettin) down the Oder and Netze. Here they met merchants from the east, the southeast and the southwest of Europe. The Byzantine, Roman and Scandinavian cultures met at Kruszwica, the largest town on the banks of this vast internal sea of Poland, and exercised a revolutionary effect upon the modes of thought and the political institutions of the tribe. Otherwise the sudden transformation which took place from the tribal and communal organization of the people, which still existed in the second half of the eighth century, to the militaristic structure of society with a strong princely power, as is known to have existed in the ninth century, becomes almost unaccountable. The pressure from the west and north was, no doubt, an important element, but it alone would hardly seem sufficient to explain the change. Economic and cultural reasons had unquestionably exercised a great influence in the rapid molding of a new form of political life which was more adapted to conditions that had arisen since the change from nomadic pursuits to settled agriculture.

Tourism 
Kruszwica has a great opportunity for development in tourism. There is a hotel with restaurant, 'Zajazd u Piasta Kołodzieja', located by the Mice Tower and the lake Gopło. There are also summer houses and campsites in the town. In the neighboring village of Kobylniki, there is a French-style palace serving as a hotel.

The town is well prepared to accommodate tourists, including foreigners, who are increasingly numerous. The city is well-developed with regard to cuisine. In Kruszwica, there are boat trips on the lake, yacht, canoe and pedal boat rentals, horse stud and carriage rides around the area, beaches and bathing areas, lake viewing terraces and other attractions.

Rowing championships for the European and Polish cup, as well as several smaller categories, are organized every year in Kruszwica.

Major corporations 
 Zakłady Tłuszczowe Kruszwica SA, manufacturing Kujawski Oil and Tina Margarine
 Kruszwica Sugar Works

Notable residents 
 Gustav Höhne (1893–1951), general
 Jakub Krzewina (born 1989), sprinter

References 

Castles of the Teutonic Knights
Cities and towns in Kuyavian-Pomeranian Voivodeship
Inowrocław County
Brześć Kujawski Voivodeship
Poznań Voivodeship (1921–1939)
Pomeranian Voivodeship (1919–1939)